The Swiss Medical Students’ Association (swimsa) is an independent association representing all medical students in Switzerland. It was founded in 1917, and currently maintains 30 member organisations, 10 of which are local medical students' associations and 20 are public health and awareness organisations/projects. 
All medical students of Basel, Bern, Fribourg, Geneva, Lausanne, Lucerne, Lugano, St. Gallen and Zurich are represented on a national and international level.

History
In 1917, the medical faculties of Switzerland unites to form the Association of Swiss Clinicians (Verband der Schweizer Klinkerschaften, VDSK).

In 1951 the IFMSA (International Federation of Medical Students' Associations) was founded by the VDSK and associations of six other countries in Copenhagen, Denmark. From then on the IFMSA has been representing the interests of medical students on an international level.
Later on the VDSK underwent a reform to become the Association of Swiss Medical Students (Verband der Schweizer Medizinstudenten) VSM, from which the organization IFMSA Switzerland had split, concentrating solely on professional clinical exchange for medical students.

In 2006 the VMS and IFMSA Switzerland approached each other and decided to create a joined venture under the name of Swiss Medical Students’ Association (swimsa). Nonetheless IFMSA-Switzerland mutated to swimsa Exchanges and remained a legally independent organization, still taking care of international exchanges. Further founding members of swimsa were the medical student organizations Achtung Liebe, promoting sexual health and education, and Gruhu, enabling medical students to volunteer for clinical electives in third world countries.

In 2014 the organization swimsa Exchanges was dissolved and formally integrated into swimsa.

Member Organisations
The student councils of the medical faculties of Basel, Bern, Fribourg, Geneva, Lausanne, Lucerne, Lugano, St. Gallen and Zurich are recognized as members of swimsa with voting rights at the national delegate assembly, which takes place twice a year. 
Other medical student organizations, also known as swimsa projects, are represented as members with voting rights as well. Currently there are ten such organizations/projects. Usually the organization/projects have their own constitutions and are as such de jure independent from swimsa.

Activities
swimsa is the official representation of Swiss dental and medical students and has seats in various commissions, such as the Commission of Swiss Medical Daculties SMIFK (Schweizerische medizinische Interfakultätskommission) or the Ministry of Health BAG (Bundesamt für Gesundheit). In addition the swimsa organizes international exchanges and takes part at the activities of the IFMSA. The association collaborates with various projects and organizations on the topics of public health, medical education, sexual and reproductive health including HIV/AIDS and human rights. The SMSC – Swiss Medical Students` Convention- takes place twice a year and enables students throughout Switzerland to meet and exchange experiences and ideas. Furthermore, once a year a trainings weekend is organized.

Awards

swimsa honors medical students with the "U ROCK swimsa Award".

The "U ROCK swimsa Award" is presented twice a year during the SMSC (usually April and November) to people who have shown excellent commitment and endurance. The candidates are chosen by the executive board to be voted on by the national delegate assembly. The following list shows the recipients since its introduction:
2008
Karin Helsing 
 David Eisner
2009
Carla Gürtler
 Patrizia Kündig
2010
Gaby Moser
Sergej Staubli
2011
Nicola Rüegsegger
Alexandra Leuenberger
2012
Samuel Zweifel
Roland Fischer
2013
Alexandre Moser
 Rainer Tan
Samuel Heiniger
2014
Clara Sailer
Anna Wang | Zurich
2015
Andrea Mauracher | Zurich
Noémie Boss | Berne
Mirjam Ryter | Basel
2016
Eleonora Frau | Fribourg
2017

2018

2019

Margaux Saudan
2020
Robin Walter
Gaia Grigorov

See also 
 American Medical Student Association (AMSA-USA)
 Australian Medical Students' Association (AMSA-AUS)
 Turkish Medical Students' International Committee (TurkMSIC)
 New Zealand Medical Students' Association (NZMSA)
 International Federation of Medical Students' Associations (IFMSA)

References

External links
 Official website in French and German Swiss Medical Students` Association

Medical and health student organizations
Medical and health organisations based in Switzerland